"Funky Cold Medina" is a hip hop song written by Young MC, Matt Dike and Michael Ross, and first performed by American rapper, actor and producer Tone Lōc. It was the second single from Lōc's debut album, Lōc-ed After Dark (1989). The single was released on March 18, 1989, and rose to number three on the Billboard Hot 100 the following month where it went platinum, selling over one million copies and becoming the second ever platinum-certified rap single (after Wild Thing from the same album being the first). It peaked on the UK Singles Chart at number 13 in May of that year.

According to Flavor Flav, who is heard using the phrase "cold medina" a year earlier on It Takes a Nation of Millions to Hold Us Back, "cold medina" was one of his assertive affirmations throughout the 1980s and was adopted by labelmates Beastie Boys as a nickname for the cocktail known as a "fuzzy navel"; Flav allegedly later advised Tone Loc to use the catchphrase in a song.

The song contains several samples. The drum break is from "Get Off Your Ass and Jam" by Funkadelic, and the main guitar riff is from "Hot Blooded" by Foreigner. Other samples are taken from "(I Can't Get No) Satisfaction" by the Rolling Stones (when this song is mentioned in the lyrics), "Christine Sixteen" by Kiss, "All Right Now" by Free and "You Ain't Seen Nothing Yet" by Bachman–Turner Overdrive.

After the song became popular, several different cocktails were introduced bearing the name "Funky Cold Medina".

Synopsis
The song tells the story of Tone Lōc's experiences with "Funky Cold Medina", a potent aphrodisiac in a beverage format. At the beginning of the song, Loc consults a fellow club-goer who appears to be having more success with women than Loc is. The unnamed stranger informs Loc that his success is the result of his use of the Funky Cold Medina, which makes anyone who drinks it irresistible to others (although this is later contradicted by lyrics that suggest that it makes those who drink it find others irresistible).

Loc initially tests the formula on his dog who, upon drinking it, becomes uncharacteristically affectionate towards Loc and appears to attract the neighbourhood dogs to Loc's house. Loc then tries the formula on a potential love interest named Sheena, but upon returning to the apartment, Loc says the love interest turns out to be a man, whom he unceremoniously ejects from his apartment. His next effort involves him appearing on Love Connection and meeting a woman who immediately wants to marry him, which scares Loc away. Ultimately Loc concludes the formula is too much trouble, and resolves to stop using it.

Track listings
 US vinyl, 12", promo
A1. "Funky Cold Medina" [Vocal] – 4:11
A2. "Funky Cold Medina" [Funky Beats] – 2:46
B1. "Funky Cold Medina" [Instrumental] – 4:08
B2. "Funky Cold Medina" [Funky Acappella] – 1:18

 US promo
 "Funky Cold Medina" [7" version] – 4:11

Charts

Weekly charts

Year-end charts

Certifications

References

1989 singles
1989 songs
Songs written by Young MC
Tone Lōc songs
Delicious Vinyl singles
Transgender-related songs